"Main Wahi Hoon" is a desi hip hop song by Raftaar, featuring Karma, released on 16 May 2019 by Zee Music Company. It is the 3rd track from Raftaar's album, "Mr. Nair".

Background 
The lyrics are a nostalgic look at their school days. The song was released on 16 May 2019 by Zee Music and is sung by Raftaar and Karma. The two artists co-wrote the song.

References 

2019 singles
Raftaar (rapper) songs
2019 songs